Gamer's Guide was a gaming magazine first published in 1980 by Brian E. Carmody.

Contents
Gamer's Guide was a magazine dedicated largely to reviews of historical, fantasy, and science fiction games.

Reception
Steve Jackson reviewed the first issue of Gamer's Guide in The Space Gamer No. 39. Jackson commented that "I give it a guarded recommendation. If your budget is very limited and you want a variety of subjects covered, then one of the 'standard' game magazines might serve you better at a lower cost per page. But if all you want is reviews, or if you can afford a number of subscriptions, give Gamer's Guide a try."

References

Game magazines